Felipe Salvador Caicedo Corozo (born 5 September 1988) is an Ecuadorian professional footballer who plays as a striker for Saudi Arabian club Abha.

A full international from 2005 to 2017, Caicedo represented Ecuador at the Copa América in 2007 and 2011, as well as at the 2014 World Cup. Caicedo is also Ecuador's sixth highest goalscorer of all-time with 22 goals to his name.

Club career

Basel
Caicedo was signed by Swiss Super League side FC Basel from Rocafuerte in his native Ecuador during the 2005–06 season for an undisclosed fee while he was just 17 years old.

Due to his youth, he was trained in the minor divisions until making his first-team debut on 10 September 2006, entering in the 80th minute of a 2–1 league victory against Zürich. He scored his first professional goal on 1 October of that year in a 4–0 Swiss Cup victory against Lugano. On 12 November, Caicedo entered at halftime as Basel were losing 2–0 to Baulmes in the Swiss Cup, and scored a goal in the 3–2 extra time victory. On 28 May he won his first professional title, the Swiss Cup, as Basel beat Luzern in the final, with Caicedo being included in the starting lineup.

He went on to play 30 games in all competitions for the Swiss club in the 2006–07 season, scoring nine goals. At the end of the season, Everton and Juventus showed interest in the player, with Milan said to have made an inquiry in winter 2007.

Manchester City
On 31 January 2008, it was announced that Manchester City had secured Caicedo's services on a four-and-a-half-year deal through a £5.2 million transfer fee (€7 million), which would make his sale one of the highest transfers in the history of the Swiss Super League. His transfer to Manchester City was completed after Caicedo was granted a work permit. Caicedo was described by his manager as "one of the great South American talents" and was also compared to the Brazilian Adriano. He made his debut on 10 February 2008, in a 2–1 away win against rivals Manchester United, coming on in the second half. He ended the season with 10 appearances in the Premier League, all of them coming on as a substitute.

Caicedo scored his first goal for City the following season in a UEFA Cup group stage loss against Racing de Santander. He scored his second consecutive goal with a back heel in a league game against West Bromwich Albion, but the goal was initially ruled as an own goal, as it hit the post and then the goalkeeper before finally going in. The goal was later given back to Caicedo after reconsideration from the Dubious Goals Committee. After these solid performances, both coming off the bench, club manager Mark Hughes gave him the opportunity to start his first game in the league and he went on to score for the third game in a row, this time scoring the first two goals in a 5–1 victory against Hull City on 26 December 2008, taking his goal tally up to four.

Caicedo opened the scoring in the first leg of the UEFA Cup last 16 tie with Aalborg BK at the City of Manchester Stadium. Manchester City won the game 2–0. Caicedo scored his sixth goal of the season for the club in the UEFA Cup quarter-finals against Hamburger SV on 16 April 2009. Although City won the match 2–1, they were eliminated from the cup 4–3 on aggregate. Caicedo impressed many Manchester City fans that season with his strong performances as a single striker with the ability to hold up the ball in key areas and shrug off defenders. Caicedo's seventh City goal came in City's 3–1 home win over Blackburn Rovers on 2 May, and netted his eighth goal in the 1–0 home win over Bolton Wanderers on the last day of the season.

Loan to Sporting CP
At the start of the 2009–10 season, Caicedo was tipped to leave City in order to get more playing time, especially after the club signed fellow forwards Roque Santa Cruz, Emmanuel Adebayor, and Carlos Tevez. On 23 July 2009, Sporting Clube de Portugal and Manchester City reached an agreement over an initial one-year loan with an option of a permanent deal, which would allow him to be part of their squad for the 2009–10 Champions League, potentially allowing Caicedo a year to develop himself as a forward before returning to Manchester City. Caicedo made his debut for Sporting CP after coming on as a substitute for an injured Hélder Postiga in the 38th minute of a 2–1 loss against Braga on 22 August 2009. After suffering a Stretched Ligament injury in a match against Braga which ruled him out of action for 3 weeks, Caicedo made his return for Sporting against Olhanense on 21 September 2009, and provided an assist for Simon Vukčević's winning goal in a 3–2 victory.   Caicedo, however, found it difficult to adapt at Sporting and his loan deal was cut short in January 2010. In total, the Ecuadorian played 11 games for the Portuguese club but failed to score in any.

Loan to Málaga
After Sporting decided to end Caicedo's loan spell at the club, other clubs showed interest in the Manchester City striker, Málaga CF and Hull City amongst them. On 8 January 2010, Caicedo decided to join Málaga on loan, rejecting an offer from Hull City.

He scored his first La Liga goal for Málaga with a beautiful individual effort against Racing de Santander, helping Málaga win 3–0 on 14 February 2010. On 10 April 2010, Caicedo scored his first goal in two months which is his second goal in 2–1 loss against Sevilla and 4 days later on 14 April 2010, Caicedo scored again after 4 days of scoring his first goal which is his third goal in a 2–2 draw against Osasuna. On the final matchday of the domestic season, Málaga required a point to stay above the relegation zone, where they faced Real Madrid at home at La Rosaleda. Caicedo started and provided a wonderful assist for Duda to open the scoring in the ninth minute. Real Madrid levelled after the break through Rafael van der Vaart, but the early goal was enough for Málaga to avoid relegation.

Loan to Levante
Just one hour before the deadline of the Spanish summer transfer window (24:00 CEST), Caicedo completed a loan move to freshly promoted Levante UD for the 2010–11 season. This revitalized his career, where by December 2010, he had contributed seven goals in 12 appearances; included in these seven goals was a brace scored against Racing de Santander on 21 November 2010. Along with a Christian Stuani strike, Levante went on to win 3–1, picking themselves out of the relegation zone after a miserable four-match losing streak.

Levante lost on 18 December 2010 to Athletic Bilbao by a score of 2–1. Caicedo scored the only goal for the hosts. This was the last game before the winter break and started an abysmal five-game losing streak for Levante that left them at the bottom of the Liga table. Levante turned this around on 29 January 2011 when they welcomed Getafe CF. Caicedo added the second goal of a 2–0 win and lifted the relegation strugglers from the bottom of the zone.

On 11 May, Caicedo scored his 13th league goal of a successful campaign against FC Barcelona at the Estadi Ciutat de València. Caicedo finished the ball in fine fashion, after capitalizing on defender Gerard Piqué's error. The game ended in a 1–1 draw, which handed Barcelona their third-straight La Liga title. The crucial point for Levante put them five points above the relegation zone with two games remaining. Caicedo's thirteen league goals helped to secure Levante's place in La Liga for a second season.

On 30 May 2011, Levante officially took up an option to sign him and on 29 June 2011, Levante signed Caicedo for £880,000. In his move, it was revealed that Levante would cash in by selling Caicedo for a large profit in the summer because the club were in debt, owing €12 million ($17 million) a year in repayments. This led to Caicedo quoting: "At €1 million, I am cheap, very cheap. Very, very, very cheap. He is a bargain, but only for Levante."

Following his time in Spain, reports showed that he travelled to Moscow because of interest from Russian Premier League clubs Lokomotiv Moscow and Anzhi Makhachkala.

Lokomotiv Moscow
On 25 July 2011, Caicedo signed a four-year contract with Lokomotiv Moscow for a fee of €7.5 million and was handed the number 25 jersey. Previously, Lokomotiv Moscow tried to sign Caicedo in the Winter Transfer Window at Russia before it closed on 10 March 2011 after Lokomotiv Moscow failed to sign Stuttgart's striker Ciprian Marica. Following his move to Lokomotiv Moscow, the president of Russian club Olga Smorodskaya accused Levante of behaving unprofessionally in the sale and hit out at Levante for their lack of co-operation during negotiations, saying to RIA Novosti :

On 14 August 2011, Caicedo made his debut in the Russian Premier League after coming on at the 61st minute for Dmitri Loskov as Lokomotiv Moscow drew 0–0 against Volga. On 28 August 2011, Caicedo scored his first goal which proved to be the winning goal against Kuban Krasnodar. After scoring for Lokomotiv Moscow, Caicedo began scoring and providing assists on a weekly basis for 4 weeks including 3 goals. The first of these goals came against FC Zenit Saint Petersburg in a 4–2 win on 10 September 2011, another against Terek Grozny in a 4–0 win, and the third and final of the run against Anzhi, a goal which again proved to be the winning goal. He had provided his one assist of the run a week before, Caicedo playing the ball to Alberto Zapater who scored his first goal for Lokomitiv Moscow in the 1–1 draw against Rubin Kazin on 25 September 2011. In the first half Russian Premier League, Caicedo made 13 league appearances, scoring 6 goals.

In the Europa League, Caicedo made his debut in the Play-off round as Lokomotiv Moscow beat Spartak Trnava 3–1 on aggregate on 25 August 2011. On 20 October 2011, Caicedo scored his first Europa League goal in a 3–1 win over AEK Athens on a Group Stage. On 16 February 2012 in the Round of 32 of the Europa League, Caicedo scored a winning goal in the 71st minute against Athletic Bilbao in a 2–1 win of the first leg of Round of 32 of the Europa League. Caicedo also provided an assist for Denis Glushakov to score a penalty in the 61st minute after Caicedo was fouled in the penalty box. In the second leg of Round of 32 of the Europa League, Caicedo played as Lokomotiv Moscow were eliminated from the Europa League after Athletic Bilbao beat Lokomotiv Moscow 1–0, winning on the away goals rule.

In the January transfer window, reports from Brazil and Ecuador claimed that Caicedo was joining Série B side Boa Esporte on loan. However, the move was rejected by Olga Smorodskaya saying that she has no intention in loaning him to Boa and says the offer was "nonsense".

Al-Jazira
In 2014, Felipe Caicedo joined Al-Jazira. Upon the arrival of Mirko Vučinić to the club, Al-Jazira and Caicedo held talks about terminating his contract, making him a Free agent.

Espanyol
On 15 July 2014, Caicedo signed for La Liga club Espanyol on a Bosman transfer after leaving UAE Arabian Gulf League club Al-Jazira.

Lazio
On 2 August 2017, Caicedo was signed by Lazio for €2.5million. He was given the number 20 by his new club. On 20 August, Caicedo made his league debut vs SPAL coming on as a substitute for Senad Lulić in the 85th minute. On 3 December, he came off the bench to score his first Serie A goal in injury-time of Lazio's 1–2 away win over Sampdoria. Notably he continued scoring a series of extra time goals, six in total, which made him the player with most goals after the 90-minute mark in the history of Serie A. Along with the one to Sampdoria these goals include games against Cagliari (1-2), Sassuolo (1-2), Juventus (3-1), Torino (3-4) and Juventus (1-1), with the exception of the 1–1 with Juventus, all games that led to a Lazio victory. While playing for Lazio he won two Italian Supercup titles (2017, 2019) and one Coppa Italia (2018-2019). During the 2019-2020 Lazio became the club for which he played the most in his career.

Genoa
On 31 August 2021, Caicedo joined Genoa.

Loan to Inter
On 29 January 2022, Caicedo joined Inter Milan on loan until the end of the 2021–22 season.

Abha
On 28 August 2022, Caicedo joined Saudi Arabian club Abha on a free transfer.

International career

On 10 February 2009, Caicedo scored the winning goal in a 3–2 victory against England's U-21 team.

On 21 March 2013, following the words of Agustín Castillo, the coach of El Salvador, that the current Ecuador team is the "best Ecuador of the history", Caicedo scored twice against El Salvador.

In September 2017, Caicedo announced his retirement from the national team after manager Gustavo Quinteros was sacked.

Career statistics

Club

International
Source:

Scores and results list Ecuador's goal tally first.

Honours
Lazio
 Coppa Italia: 2018–19
 Supercoppa Italiana: 2017, 2019

Inter Milan
 Coppa Italia: 2021–22

References

External links
 
 
 

1988 births
Living people
Ecuadorian footballers
Ecuador international footballers
Ecuadorian expatriate footballers
Expatriate footballers in England
Expatriate footballers in Spain
Expatriate footballers in Switzerland
Expatriate footballers in Portugal
Expatriate footballers in Russia
Expatriate footballers in Saudi Arabia
Expatriate footballers in the United Arab Emirates
Association football forwards
FC Basel players
Levante UD footballers
Málaga CF players
RCD Espanyol footballers
S.S. Lazio players
Manchester City F.C. players
Sporting CP footballers
FC Lokomotiv Moscow players
Al Jazira Club players
Genoa C.F.C. players
Inter Milan players
Abha Club players
Swiss Super League players
La Liga players
Premier League players
Primeira Liga players
Serie A players
Russian Premier League players
Saudi Professional League players
2007 Copa América players
2011 Copa América players
2014 FIFA World Cup players
Ecuadorian expatriate sportspeople in England
Ecuadorian expatriate sportspeople in Spain
Ecuadorian expatriate sportspeople in Switzerland
Ecuadorian expatriate sportspeople in Saudi Arabia
UAE Pro League players